Roe Highway is a  limited-access highway and partial freeway in Perth, Western Australia, linking Kewdale with the city's north-eastern and south-western suburbs. The northern terminus is at Reid Highway and Great Northern Highway in Middle Swan, and the southern terminus is with Murdoch Drive at the Kwinana Freeway interchange in Bibra Lake. Roe Highway, in addition to Reid Highway, form State Route 3, a partial ring road around the outer suburbs of the Perth metropolitan area. Roe Highway also forms part of National Highway 94 from Great Eastern Highway Bypass to Great Eastern Highway, and National Highway 95 from Great Eastern Highway to Great Northern Highway.

Although planning for Roe Highway's route began in the 1950s, construction on the highway's first segment only began in 1981, which was opened in 1983, concurrent with the construction of Tonkin Highway and development of the Kewdale industrial area. The highway remains a key heavy vehicle route in the Perth metropolitan area. In the 1980s and 1990s, most of the highway's interchanges with other roads were constructed as at-grade intersections with traffic lights, as were Perth's other arterial highways also constructed during that time. From 2002 to 2006, the  section of the highway from Tonkin Highway to Kwinana Freeway was constructed as a continuous freeway, with grade-separated interchanges and free traffic flow, and since 2012 several remaining at-grade intersections of the rest of the highway have been grade-separated. Six at-grade traffic-light controlled intersections remain on the highway today.

Planning provisions have proposed for Roe Highway to be extended from its current south-western terminus in Bibra Lake towards Fremantle since the 1950s. These plans have been controversial amongst conservationist and community groups due to the highway's proposed route through the environmentally sensitive Beeliar Wetlands. The Western Australian state government commenced construction on the first stage of an extension of Roe Highway from Kwinana Freeway to Stock Road (known as Roe Highway Stage 8) in December 2016; construction of the extension was suspended in March 2017 following a change of government in the 2017 state election. The new government has since reconfigured the extension to curve northwards to link with Murdoch Drive instead. Construction on this project commenced in 2018 and was completed in April 2020.

Route description
Roe Highway is part of State Route 3, Perth's partial outer ring road, though it also carries National Highways 94 and 95 for parts of the highway. A dual carriageway limited-access highway maintained by Main Roads Western Australia, most junctions along the road are grade-separated interchanges, though some are at-grade traffic-light controlled intersections; the  section between Tonkin Highway and the Kwinana Freeway (a little more than half the highway's entire length) is a continuous freeway.

A principal shared path (PSP) exists alongside most of Roe Highway, from Berkshire Road to Kwinana Freeway.

Middle Swan to Forrestfield 
Roe Highway commences in Middle Swan within the City of Swan local government area (LGA) at Great Northern Highway at a traffic light controlled intersection as an eastern continuation of Reid Highway. Upon the highway's commencement it is carrying both State Route 3 (continuing from Reid Highway) and National Highway 95 (continuing from Great Northern Highway to the north). The highway then curves to the south, reaching Toodyay Road  later. From there the highway briefly borders the suburb of Stratton before entering Midvale, reaching another traffic light controlled intersection with Morrison Road  later. Only another  takes the highway to Great Eastern Highway at a modified diamond interchange with a northbound to eastbound loop ramp to cater for heavy vehicles. At this interchange, National Highway 95 terminates here, and simultaneously gains the National Highway 94 allocation, continuing from Great Eastern Highway to the east.

Following the Great Eastern Highway interchange Roe Highway is entirely within the suburb of Bellevue, getting to Clayton Street only  further on. It is a half diamond interchange with only a northbound exit and southbound entry ramp. At this intersection National Highway 95 continues west on the Bypass. After , Roe Highway enters the City of Kalamunda LGA, bordering the suburbs of High Wycombe and Maida Vale and then reaches Kalamunda Road at a dogbone interchange  later. Another  takes the highway to another half diamond interchange at Maida Vale Road, also with only northbound exit and southbound entrance ramps.  later, Roe Highway reaches Berkshire Road at a diamond interchange with a "tennis ball" configuration, with traffic cutting through the roundabouts rather than circulating around them. At the same time the highway enters the suburb of Forrestfield. Another  takes the highway to Tonkin Highway. This major junction was originally a diamond interchange favouring Tonkin Highway, but is now a partial freeway-to-freeway interchange, with the left turns from Roe Highway free-flowing. There are plans to upgrade this junction into being a fully free-flowing interchange in the future.

Forrestfield to Bibra Lake 
Following the interchange at Tonkin Highway, Roe Highway now forms the boundaries of the City of Belmont and Kalamunda LGAs to the west and east, respectively, as well as their respective suburbs, Kewdale and Wattle Grove, before crossing freight railway lines and briefly entering the suburbs of East Cannington and Welshpool within the vicinity of the Orrong Road and Welshpool Road East interchange, within the City of Gosnells LGA,  further south from Tonkin Highway. Within this stretch the highway is four lanes southbound and three lanes northbound. Roe Highway is thereafter within the suburb of Beckenham, with the freight railway line travelling alongside the highway's eastern side. Roe Highway reaches Kenwick Link (a bypass of Albany Highway)  further south. Midway through these interchanges, the highway passes under Brixton Street and the bypassed section of Albany Highway. The highway, which is now within the City of Canning and bordering the residential suburb of Parkwood and industrial suburb of Canning Vale, reaches Willeri Drive  further west, after which it is now bordering Willetton to the north, and then reaches South Street  further southwest. Following this interchange Roe Highway is now within the City of Cockburn and bordering the suburbs of Leeming and Jandakot, reaching Karel Avenue  further west. After , Roe Highway reaches a partial combination interchange (originally a trumpet interchange) at the junction of the Kwinana Freeway (this interchange lacks southbound-to-westbound and eastbound-to-northbound movements) in Bibra Lake; Roe Highway terminates at this interchange, continuing northwards as Murdoch Drive.

History
Roe Highway was first proposed in 1955 by Gordon Stephenson as part of what was to become the Metropolitan Region Planning Scheme. The highway was intended to form the southern and eastern sections of a ring route around the Perth metropolitan area. It is named in honour of John Septimus Roe, who arrived in Western Australia in 1829 and served as the first state Surveyor General of Western Australia for 41 years.

Work began in 1981, with the first section between the Beechboro-Gosnells Highway and Bushmead Road opening in 1983. The next section, from Bushmead Road to Great Eastern Highway was opened in 1984. The third stage, linking the Great Eastern Highway and Great Northern Highway opened on 14 December 1988, at the same time as the Great Eastern Highway Bypass opened. The state Minister for Transport, Bob Pearce was assisted in the opening ceremony by Jason and Rachael Roe, two of the sixth generation of the Roe family to live in Australia and descendants of John Septimus Roe. The new roads provided a limited access dual carriageway bypass of the historical Guildford and Midland districts that were much needed at the time.

In 1994, the highway was extended  further southwards from Tonkin Highway to Welshpool Road. Following seven years in hiatus, work recommenced, and in 2001 a new  southwestern extension known as stage 4 was completed from Welshpool Road to the purpose-built Kenwick Link (an Albany Highway bypass built in 1998)most of which replaced the overtaxed William Street in Beckenham. Work on the  stage 5 was undertaken simultaneously with stage 4, bringing the highway to Nicholson Road in 2002.

Stage 6, a  extension from Nicholson Road to South Street was completed in 2004, with stage 7 being announced shortly afterwards. Prior to 2006, the exit to the freeway from the present Roe Highway Intersection was Hope Road. Hope Road is now a series of local streets with the east of the freeway accessing to the West Power Jandakot Distribution Centre.

The  of road built since 1994 between Tonkin Highway and Kwinana Freeway, is to a freeway standard. It may in the future be upgraded to a freeway classification.

In June 2012, the new grade-separated interchange opened at the Great Eastern Highway intersection, allowing free-flowing traffic on Roe Highway over Great Eastern Highway. The design includes a northbound to eastbound loop ramp to cater for heavy vehicles, and three pedestrian underpasses.

Proposal to extend Roe to Fremantle

Roe Highway was first proposed in 1955 by Gordon Stephenson as part of what was to become the Metropolitan Region Planning Scheme. The highway was intended to form the southern and eastern sections of a ring route around the Perth metropolitan area. In the 1950s, Stephenson planned for Roe Highway to continue westwards towards Fremantle, through South Fremantle along Marine Terrace and then north to connect with Stirling Highway and the Port of Fremantle. As part of the plan, in 1974 Stirling Highway was extended from its then terminus north of the Swan River southwards to Canning Highway. Over a period of approximately 20 years, Main Roads Western Australia procured land, and in 1985, Stirling Highway was extended southwards from Canning Highway to High Street (the western continuation of Leach Highway). The remaining  strip of land south of High Street then became known as the Fremantle Eastern Bypass.

With a change of state governments in 2001, the planned Fremantle Eastern Bypass / Roe Highway stage 8 was cancelled, with a commitment by the government to sell the land reserved for the Fremantle Eastern Bypass. As part of the funding arrangement for Roe Highway stages 6 and 7, the federal government stipulated that the Roe Highway stage 8 reservation was to be retained.

Following a change in state governments in September 2008, planning work commenced on an extension of Roe Highway from Kwinana Freeway to Stock Road. Parliamentary debate continued in 2012 as the state government continued its intention to implement the plan.

The plan was ultimately formalised as The Perth Freight Link in May 2014, a $1.6 billion project to improve the road freight link between Kewdale and Fremantle Harbour. In addition to the  extension of Roe Highway, upgrades were also planned for Stock Road, Leach Highway, and High Street to provide a grade-separated route, bypassing fourteen sets of traffic signals. The plan included mandatory GPS tracking of all vehicles over an undisclosed size or weight with a charge per kilometre applied for vehicles travelling in the area between Muchea and North Fremantle. The extension would have taken the highway from its current terminus at Kwinana Freeway approximately  further west to Stock Road, near Forrest Road in Coolbellup. The proposed route was along or within the vicinity of an existing road reserve in the Perth Metropolitan Region Scheme.

In September 2015 the group Save the Beeliar Wetlands took legal action against the Environmental Protection Agency (EPA), arguing that the EPA did not follow its own policies. Preliminary works began on the project during November 2015, which drew protests with many people being given move-on orders preventing them from being in the area. On 16 December 2015 the Supreme Court handed down its findings: that because the EPA did not follow its published policies as it was legally obliged to, the approval of Roe 8 and the subsequent approval given by the environment minister Albert Jacobs were invalid.

Noongar custodian Corina Abraham, on behalf of the local Whadjuk Noongar people filed writs against members of the Department of Aboriginal Affairs cultural committee and the current WA Minister for Aboriginal Affairs Peter Collier in the WA Supreme Court on 30 March 2016. The writs allege that they did not receive procedural fairness as both Abraham and her now deceased father were part of the group consulted in the original group consulted in the report which the committee later overturned to enable the project's approval. Abraham's lawyer Greg McIntyre QC (who had also been Eddie Mabo's lawyer) also sought an injunction to prevent the minister making any decisions based on the new recommendation until the matter is heard by the court.

2017 State election and the Murdoch Drive Connection
After the 2017 state election, the incoming McGowan Government stated it intended to scrap the entire project. On 12 March, Main Roads and the contractors agreed to suspend work on the project.

In early 2018 plans were revealed to extend Roe Highway to curve northwards to meet Murdoch Drive instead, with modifications made to the existing Kwinana Freeway interchange, converting it from a trumpet to a modified combination interchange though with no access from Kwinana Freeway south to Murdoch Drive west nor Murdoch Drive east to Kwinana Freeway north due to the nearby Farrington Road interchange providing the same required movements to enter/exit the freeway. A modified half diamond interchange between Murdoch Drive and Farrington Road/Bibra Drive was also constructed to provide an upgraded southern access to the Murdoch activity centre. The project was completed on 20 April 2020.

Gateway WA

Gateway WA was a $1 billion project that upgraded the road network around Perth Airport. It was, at the time, the largest project Main Roads Western Australia had ever undertaken, covering the upgrade of Tonkin, Leach, and Roe Highways, and the construction of four new interchanges. The project was jointly funded by state and federal governments, which provided $317.5 million and $686.4 million respectively.

As part of the project, Roe Highway's interchange with Tonkin Highway was upgraded, noise walls were erected along Roe Highway in High Wycombe, and a new interchange between Roe Highway and Berkshire Road was constructed. The project was completed in April 2016.

Karel Avenue Interchange Upgrade
Work commenced in July 2019 to widen Karel Avenue to four lanes between Farrington Road and Berrigan Drive, including duplication of the bridge crossing the Roe Highway. Despite the interchange itself only opening in 2006, the $15 million upgrade was required due to the development of the Jandakot City project to the south of the interchange along with the construction of the Thornlie-Cockburn Link. This is due for completion in mid-2021.

Kalamunda Road Interchange
The $86 million project to convert the intersection of Roe Highway and Kalamunda Road to a dogbone interchange started in September 2019 as part of the progressive removal of at-grade signalised intersections along Roe Highway. This is due for completion . A staged extension of the Principal Shared Path (PSP) is also being built between the existing Berkshire and future Kalamunda Road interchanges. The Berkshire-Maida Vale Road section was completed in September 2020, with the Maida Vale-Kalamunda section .

Future

Great Eastern Highway Bypass Interchange
Planning and development of an interchange between Roe Highway and the Great Eastern Highway Bypass is also underway as part of a wider upgrade of infrastructure in the Hazelmere industrial area. Once completed there will be just two sets of traffic lights intersections south of the Great Eastern Highway.

Interchanges and intersections

See also

 Highways in Australia
 Highways in Western Australia
 Freeways in Australia
 Freeways in Western Australia

Notes

References

 Hepburn, J.A. & Stephenson, G. 1955, Plan for the metropolitan region, Perth and Fremantle, Western Australia, 1955: a report prepared for the Government of Western Australia, Government Printing Office, Perth.

Main Roads WA
The Roe7 Project
Skyview WA – Department of Land Information, Western Australia 

Highways and freeways in Perth, Western Australia
Articles containing video clips